Boris Isaković (born 14 December 1966) is a Serbian actor. He has appeared in more than thirty films since 1990.

Personal life 

He is married to Serbian actress Jasna Đuričić and together they reside in  Novi Sad.

Selected filmography

References

External links 

1966 births
Living people
Actors from Novi Sad
Serbian male film actors
Miloš Žutić Award winners